Johannes Hölz (2 July 1906 – 29 April 1945) was a highly decorated Generalmajor in the Wehrmacht during World War II.  He was also a recipient of the Knight's Cross of the Iron Cross. Johannes Hölz was killed on 29 April 1945 during the retreat of 9. Armee during the Battle of Halbe.

Awards and decorations
 Iron Cross (1939)
 2nd Class
 1st Class
 Eastern Front Medal
 German Cross in Gold (5 May 1943)
 Knight's Cross of the Iron Cross on 10 October 1944 as Oberst i.G. and Chief of the General Staff of LV. Armeekorps

References

Citations

Bibliography

External links

Lexikon der Wehrmacht
TracesOfWar.com

1906 births
1945 deaths
People from Münsingen, Germany
People from the Kingdom of Württemberg
Major generals of the German Army (Wehrmacht)
Recipients of the Gold German Cross
Recipients of the Knight's Cross of the Iron Cross
German Army personnel killed in World War II
Military personnel from Baden-Württemberg
German Army generals of World War II